Kurtzia kilburni is an extinct species of sea snail, a marine gastropod mollusk in the family Mangeliidae.

Description
The length of the shell attains 3 mm.

Distribution
This extinct marine species was found in Miocene strata of Central Chile.

References

kilburni